In materials science, the term single-layer materials or 2D materials refers to crystalline solids consisting of a single layer of atoms. These materials are promising for some applications but remain the focus of research. Single-layer materials derived from single elements generally carry the -ene suffix in their names, e.g. graphene. Single-layer materials that are compounds of two or more elements have -ane or -ide suffixes. 2D materials can generally be categorized as either 2D allotropes of various elements or as compounds (consisting of two or more covalently bonding elements).

It is predicted that there are hundreds of stable single-layer materials. The atomic structure and calculated basic properties of these and many other potentially synthesisable single-layer materials, can be found in computational databases. 2D materials can be produced using mainly two approaches: top-down exfoliation and bottom-up synthesis. The exfoliation methods include sonication, mechanical, hydrothermal, electrochemical, laser-assisted, and microwave-assisted exfoliation.

Single element materials

C: graphene and graphyne
Graphene

Graphene is a crystalline allotrope of carbon in the form of a nearly transparent (to visible light) one atom thick sheet. It is hundreds of times stronger than most steels by weight. It has the highest known thermal and electrical conductivity, displaying current densities 1,000,000 times that of copper. It was first produced in 2004.

Andre Geim and Konstantin Novoselov won the 2010 Nobel Prize in Physics "for groundbreaking experiments regarding the two-dimensional material graphene". They first produced it by lifting graphene flakes from bulk graphite with adhesive tape and then transferring them onto a silicon wafer.

Graphyne
Graphyne is another 2-dimensional carbon allotrope whose structure is similar to graphene's. It can be seen as a lattice of benzene rings connected by acetylene bonds. Depending on the content of the acetylene groups, graphyne can be considered a mixed hybridization, spn, where 1 < n < 2, compared to graphene (pure sp2) and diamond (pure sp3).

First-principle calculations using phonon dispersion curves and ab-initio finite temperature, quantum mechanical molecular dynamics simulations showed graphyne and its boron nitride analogues to be stable.

The existence of graphyne was conjectured before 1960. It has not yet been synthesized. However, graphdiyne (graphyne with diacetylene groups) was synthesized on copper substrates. Recently, it has been claimed to be a competitor for graphene due to the potential of direction-dependent Dirac cones.

B: borophene 

Borophene is a crystalline atomic monolayer of boron and is also known as boron sheet. 
First predicted by theory in the mid-1990s in a freestanding state, and then demonstrated as distinct monoatomic layers on substrates by Zhang et al., 
different borophene structures were experimentally confirmed in 2015.

Ge: germanene 

Germanene is a two-dimensional allotrope of germanium with a buckled honeycomb structure. 
Experimentally synthesized germanene exhibits a honeycomb structure. 
This honeycomb structure consists of two hexagonal sub-lattices that are vertically displaced by 0.2 A from each other.

Si: silicene 

Silicene is a two-dimensional allotrope of silicon, with a hexagonal honeycomb structure similar to that of graphene. Its growth is scaffolded by a pervasive Si/Ag(111) surface alloy beneath the two-dimensional layer.

Sn: stanene 

Stanene is a predicted topological insulator that may display dissipationless currents at its edges near room temperature. It is composed of tin atoms arranged in a single layer, in a manner similar to graphene. Its buckled structure leads to high reactivity against common air pollutants such as NOx and COx and it is able to trap and dissociate them at low temperature.
A structure determination of stanene using low energy electron diffraction has shown ultra-flat stanene on a Cu(111) surface.

Pb: plumbene 
Plumbene is a two-dimensional allotrope of lead, with a hexagonal honeycomb structure similar to that of graphene.

P: phosphorene 

Phosphorene is a 2-dimensional, crystalline allotrope of phosphorus. Its mono-atomic hexagonal structure makes it conceptually similar to graphene. However, phosphorene has substantially different electronic properties; in particular it possesses a nonzero band gap while displaying high electron mobility. This property potentially makes it a better semiconductor than graphene. 
The synthesis of phosphorene mainly consists of micromechanical cleavage or liquid phase exfoliation methods. The former has a low yield while the latter produce free standing nanosheets in solvent and not on the solid support. The bottom-up approaches like chemical vapor deposition (CVD) are still blank because of its high reactivity. Therefore, in the current scenario, the most effective method for large area fabrication of thin films of phosphorene consists of wet assembly techniques like Langmuir-Blodgett involving the assembly followed by deposition of nanosheets on solid supports.

Sb: antimonene 

Antimonene is a two-dimensional allotrope of antimony, with its atoms arranged in a buckled honeycomb lattice. Theoretical calculations predicted that antimonene would be a stable semiconductor in ambient conditions with suitable performance for (opto)electronics. Antimonene was first isolated in 2016 by micromechanical exfoliation and it was found to be very stable under ambient conditions. Its properties make it also a good candidate for biomedical and energy applications.

In a study made in 2018, antimonene modified screen-printed electrodes (SPE's) were subjected to a galvanostatic charge/discharge test using a two-electrode approach to characterize their supercapacitive properties. The best configuration observed, which contained 36 nanograms of antimonene in the SPE, showed a specific capacitance of 1578 F g−1 at a current of 14 A g−1. Over 10,000 of these galvanostatic cycles, the capacitance retention values drop to 65% initially after the first 800 cycles, but then remain between 65% and 63% for the remaining 9,200 cycles. The 36 ng antimonene/SPE system also showed an energy density of 20 mW h kg−1 and a power density of 4.8 kW kg−1. These supercapacitive properties indicate that antimonene is a promising electrode material for supercapacitor systems. A more recent study, concerning antimonene modified SPEs shows the inherent ability of antimonene layers to form electrochemically passivated layers to facilite electroanalytical measurements in oxygenated environments, in which the presence of dissolved oxygens normally hinders the analytical procedure. The same study also depicts the in-situ production of antimonene oxide/PEDOT:PSS nanocomposites as electrocatalytic platforms for the determination of nitroaromatic compounds.

Bi: bismuthene 

Bismuthene, the two-dimensional (2D) allotrope of bismuth, was predicted to be a topological insulator. It was predicted that bismuthene retains its topological phase when grown on silicon carbide in 2015. The prediction was successfully realized and synthesized in 2016. At first glance the system is similar to graphene, as the Bi atoms arrange in a honeycomb lattice. However the bandgap is as large as 800mV due to the large spin–orbit interaction (coupling) of the Bi atoms and their interaction with the substrate. Thus, room-temperature applications of the quantum spin Hall effect come into reach. It has been reported to be the largest nontrivial bandgap 2D topological insulator in its natural state. Top-down exfoliation of bismuthene has been reported in various instances with recent works promoting the implementation of bismuthene in the field of electrochemical sensing. Emdadul et al. predicted the mechanical strength and phonon thermal conductivity of monolayer β-bismuthene through atomic-scale analysis. The obtained room temperature (300K) fracture strength is ~4.21 N/m along the armchair direction and ~4.22 N/m along the zigzag direction. At 300 K, its Young's moduli are reported to be ~26.1 N/m and ~25.5 N/m, respectively, along the armchair and zigzag directions. In addition, their predicted phonon thermal conductivity of ~1.3 W/m∙K at 300 K is considerably lower than other analogous 2D honeycombs, making it a promising material for thermoelectric operations.

Metals 

Single and double atom layers of platinum in a two-dimensional film geometry has been demonstrated. These atomically thin platinum films are epitaxially grown on graphene which imposes a compressive strain that modifies the surface chemistry of the platinum, while also allowing charge transfer through the graphene. Single atom layers of palladium with the thickness down to 2.6 Å, and rhodium with the thickness of less than 4 Å have also been synthesized and characterized with atomic force microscopy and transmission electron microscopy.

2D alloys 

Two-dimensional alloys (or surface alloys) are a single atomic layer of alloy that is incommensurate with the underlying substrate. One example is the 2D ordered alloys of Pb with Sn and with Bi. Surface alloys have been found to scaffold two-dimensional layers, as in the case of silicene.

2D supracrystals 

The supracrystals of 2D materials have been proposed and theoretically simulated. These monolayer crystals are built of supra atomic periodic structures where atoms in the nodes of the lattice are replaced by symmetric complexes. For example, in the hexagonal structure of graphene patterns of 4 or 6 carbon atoms would be arranged hexagonally instead of single atoms, as the repeating node in the unit cell.

Compounds
Boron nitride nanosheet

Titanate nanosheet
Borocarbonitrides
MXenes
2D silica
Niobium bromide and Niobium chloride

Transition metal dichalcogenide monolayers 

The most commonly studied two-dimensional transition metal dichalcogenide (TMD) is monolayer molybdenum disulfide (MoS2). Several phases are known, notably the 1T and 2H phases. The naming convention reflects the structure: the 1T phase has one "sheet" (consisting of a layer of S-Mo-S; see figure) per unit cell in a trigonal crystal system, while the 2H phase has two sheets per unit cell in a hexagonal crystal system. The 2H phase is more common, as the 1T phase is metastable and spontaneously reverts to 2H without stabilization by additional electron donors (typically surface S vacancies).

The 2H phase of MoS2 (Pearson symbol hP6; Strukturbericht designation C7) has space group P63/mmc. Each layer contains Mo surrounded by S in trigonal prismatic coordination. Conversely, the 1T phase (Pearson symbol hP3) has space group P-3m1, and octahedrally-coordinated Mo; with the 1T unit cell containing only one layer, the unit cell has a c parameter slightly less than half the length of that of the 2H unit cell (5.95 Å and 12.30 Å, respectively). The different crystal structures of the two phases result in differences in their electronic band structure as well. The d-orbitals of 2H-MoS2 are split into three bands: dz2, dx2-y2,xy, and dxz,yz. Of these, only the dz2 is filled; this combined with the splitting results in a semiconducting material with a bandgap of 1.9eV. 1T-MoS2, on the other hand, has partially filled d-orbitals which give it a metallic character.

Because the structure consists of in-plane covalent bonds and inter-layer van der Waals interactions, the electronic properties of monolayer TMDs are highly anisotropic. For example, the conductivity of MoS2 in the direction parallel to the planar layer (0.1–1 ohm-1cm-1) is ~2200 times larger than the conductivity perpendicular to the layers. There are also differences between the properties of a monolayer compared to the bulk material: the Hall mobility at room temperature is drastically lower for monolayer 2H MoS2 (0.1–10 cm2V-1s-1) than for bulk MoS2 (100–500 cm2V-1s-1). This difference arises primarily due to charge traps between the monolayer and the substrate it is deposited on.

MoS2 has important applications in (electro)catalysis. As with other two-dimensional materials, properties can be highly geometry-dependent; the surface of MoS2 is catalytically inactive, but the edges can act as active sites for catalyzing reactions. For this reason, device engineering and fabrication may involve considerations for maximizing catalytic surface area, for example by using small nanoparticles rather than large sheets or depositing the sheets vertically rather than horizontally. Catalytic efficiency also depends strongly on the phase: the aforementioned electronic properties of 2H MoS2 make it a poor candidate for catalysis applications, but these issues can be circumvented through a transition to the metallic (1T) phase. The 1T phase has more suitable properties, with a current density of 10 mA/cm2, an overpotential of –187 mV relative to RHE, and a Tafel slope of 43 mV/decade (compared to 94 mV/decade for the 2H phase).

Graphane
While graphene has a hexagonal honeycomb lattice structure with alternating double-bonds emerging from its sp2-bonded carbons, graphane, still maintaining the hexagonal structure, is the fully hydrogenated version of graphene with every sp3-hybrized carbon bonded to a hydrogen (chemical formula of (CH)n). Furthermore, while graphene is planar due to its double-bonded nature, graphane is rugged, with the hexagons adopting different out-of-plane structural conformers like the chair or boat, to allow for the ideal 109.5° angles which reduce ring strain, in a direct analogy to the conformers of cyclohexane. Graphane was first theorized in 2003, was shown to be stable using first principles energy calculations in 2007, and was first experimentally synthesized in 2009. There are various experimental routes available for making graphane, including the top-down approaches of reduction of graphite in solution or hydrogenation of graphite using plasma/hydrogen gas as well as the bottom-up approach of chemical vapor deposition. Graphane is an insulator, with a predicted band gap of 3.5 eV; however, partially hydrogenated graphene is a semi-conductor, with the band gap being controlled by the degree of hydrogenation.

Germanane 
Germanane is a single-layer crystal composed of germanium with one hydrogen bonded in the z-direction for each atom. Germanane's structure is similar to graphane, Bulk germanium does not adopt this structure. Germanane is produced in a two-step route starting with calcium germanide. From this material, the calcium (Ca) is removed by de-intercalation with HCl to give a layered solid with the empirical formula GeH. The Ca sites in Zintl-phase CaGe2 interchange with the hydrogen atoms in the HCl solution, producing GeH and CaCl2.

Combined surface alloying 

Often single-layer materials, specifically elemental allotrops, are connected to the supporting substrate via surface alloys. By now, this phenomena has been proven via a combination of different measurement techniques for silicene, for which the alloy is difficult to prove by a single technique, and hence has not been expected for a long time. Hence, such scaffolding surface alloys beneath two-dimensional materials can be also expected below other two-dimensional materials, significantly influencing the properties of the two-dimensional layer. During growth, the alloy acts as both, foundation and scaffold for the two-dimensional layer, for which it paves the way.

Organic 
Ni3(HITP)2 is an organic, crystalline, structurally tunable electrical conductor with a high surface area. HITP is an organic chemical (2,3,6,7,10,11-hexaaminotriphenylene). It shares graphene's hexagonal honeycomb structure. Multiple layers naturally form perfectly aligned stacks, with identical 2-nm openings at the centers of the hexagons. Room temperature electrical conductivity is ~40 S cm−1, comparable to that of bulk graphite and among the highest for any conducting metal-organic frameworks (MOFs). The temperature dependence of its conductivity is linear at temperatures between 100 K and 500 K, suggesting an unusual charge transport mechanism that has not been previously observed in organic semiconductors.

The material was claimed to be the first of a group formed by switching metals and/or organic compounds. The material can be isolated as a powder or a film with conductivity values of 2 and 40 S cm−1, respectively.

Polymer 
Using melamine (carbon and nitrogen ring structure) as a monomer, researchers created 2DPA-1, a 2-dimensional polymer sheet held together by hydrogen bonds. The sheet forms spontaneously in solution, allowing thin films to be spin-coated. The polymer has a yield strength twice that of steel, and it resists six times more deformation force than bulletproof glass. It is impermeable to gases and liquids.

Combinations
Single layers of 2D materials can be combined into layered assemblies. For example, bilayer graphene is a material consisting of two layers of graphene. One of the first reports of bilayer graphene was in the seminal 2004 Science paper by Geim and colleagues, in which they described devices "which contained just one, two, or three atomic layers". Layered combinations of different 2D materials are generally called van der Waals heterostructures. Twistronics is the study of how the angle (the twist) between layers of two-dimensional materials can change their electrical properties.

Characterization  
Microscopy techniques such as transmission electron microscopy, 3D electron diffraction, scanning probe microscopy, scanning tunneling microscope, and atomic-force microscopy are used to characterize the thickness and size of the 2D materials. Electrical properties and structural properties such as composition and defects are characterized by Raman spectroscopy, X-ray diffraction, and X-ray photoelectron spectroscopy.

Mechanical characterization 
The mechanical characterization of 2D materials is difficult due to ambient reactivity and substrate constraints present in many 2D materials. To this end, many mechanical properties are calculated using molecular dynamics simulations or molecular mechanics simulations. Experimental mechanical characterization is possible in 2D materials which can survive the conditions of the experimental setup as well as can be deposited on suitable substrates or exist in a free-standing form. Many 2D materials also possess out-of-plane deformation which further convolute measurements.

Nanoindentation testing is commonly used to experimentally measure elastic modulus, hardness, and fracture strength of 2D materials. From these directly measured values, models exist which allow the estimation of fracture toughness, work hardening exponent, residual stress, and yield strength. These experiments are ran using dedicated nanoindentation equipment or an Atomic Force Microscope (AFM). Nanoindentation experiments are generally ran with the 2D material as a linear strip clamped on both ends experiencing indentation by a wedge, or with the 2D material as a circular membrane clamped around the circumference experiencing indentation by a curbed tip in the center. The strip geometry is difficult to prepare but allows for easier analysis due to linear resulting stress fields. The circular drum-like geometry is more commonly used and can be easily prepared by exfoliating samples onto a patterned substrate. The stress applied to the film in the clamping process can be is refereed to as the residual stress.  In the case of very thin layers of 2D materials bending stress is generally ignored in indentation measurements, with bending stress becoming relevant in multilayer samples. Elastic modulus and residual stress values can be extracted by determining the linear and cubic portions of the experimental force-displacement curve. The fracture stress of the 2D sheet is extracted from the applied stress at failure of the sample. AFM tip size was found to have little effect on elastic property measurement, but the breaking force was found to have a strong tip size dependence due stress concentration at the apex of the tip. Using these techniques the elastic modulus and yield strength of graphene were found to be 342 N/m and 55 N/m respectively.

Poisson's ratio measurements in 2D materials is generally straightforward. To get a value, a 2D sheet is placed under stress and displacement responses are measured, or an MD calculation is ran. The unique structures found in 2D materials have been found to result in auxetic behavior in phosphorene and graphene and a Poisson's ratio of zero in triangular lattice borophene.  

Shear modulus measurements of graphene has been extracted by measuring a resonance frequency shift in a double paddle oscillator experiment as well as with MD simulations.

Fracture toughness of 2D materials in Mode I (KIC) has been measured directly by stretching pre-cracked layers and monitoring crack propagation in real-time. MD simulations as well as molecular mechanics simulations have also been used to calculate fracture toughness in Mode I. In anisotropic materials, such as phosphorene, crack propagation was found to happen preferentially along certain directions. Most 2D materials were found to undergo brittle fracture.

Applications 

The major expectation held amongst researchers is that given their exceptional properties, 2D materials will replace conventional semiconductors to deliver a new generation of electronics.

Biological applications
Research on 2D nanomaterials is still in its infancy, with the majority of research focusing on elucidating the unique material characteristics and few reports focusing on biomedical applications of 2D nanomaterials. Nevertheless, recent rapid advances in 2D nanomaterials have raised important yet exciting questions about their interactions with biological moieties. 2D nanoparticles such as carbon-based 2D materials, silicate clays, transition metal dichalcogenides (TMDs), and transition metal oxides (TMOs) provide enhanced physical, chemical, and biological functionality owing to their uniform shapes, high surface-to-volume ratios, and surface charge.

Two-dimensional (2D) nanomaterials are ultrathin nanomaterials with a high degree of anisotropy and chemical functionality. 2D nanomaterials are highly diverse in terms of their mechanical, chemical, and optical properties, as well as in size, shape, biocompatibility, and degradability. These diverse properties make 2D nanomaterials suitable for a wide range of applications, including drug delivery, imaging, tissue engineering, biosensors, and gas sensors among others. However, their low-dimension nanostructure gives them some common characteristics. For example, 2D nanomaterials are the thinnest materials known, which means that they also possess the highest specific surface areas of all known materials. This characteristic makes these materials invaluable for applications requiring high levels of surface interactions on a small scale. As a result, 2D nanomaterials are being explored for use in drug delivery systems, where they can adsorb large numbers of drug molecules and enable superior control over release kinetics. Additionally, their exceptional surface area to volume ratios and typically high modulus values make them useful for improving the mechanical properties of biomedical nanocomposites and nanocomposite hydrogels, even at low concentrations. Their extreme thinness has been instrumental for breakthroughs in biosensing and gene sequencing. Moreover, the thinness of these molecules allows them to respond rapidly to external signals such as light, which has led to utility in optical therapies of all kinds, including imaging applications, photothermal therapy (PTT), and photodynamic therapy (PDT).

Despite the rapid pace of development in the field of 2D nanomaterials, these materials must be carefully evaluated for biocompatibility in order to be relevant for biomedical applications. The newness of this class of materials means that even the relatively well-established 2D materials like graphene are poorly understood in terms of their physiological interactions with living tissues. Additionally, the complexities of variable particle size and shape, impurities from manufacturing, and protein and immune interactions have resulted in a patchwork of knowledge on the biocompatibility of these materials.

See also
Monolayer
Two-dimensional semiconductor
Transition metal dichalcogenide monolayers

References

Additional reading

Condensed matter physics
Semiconductors
Monolayers